The United States has appeared at the Hopman Cup from the 2nd staging of the event in 1990. The United States has appeared in eleven Hopman Cup finals and have a record six victories. It is one of two countries to successfully defend the title (alongside Switzerland) and holds the record for consecutive final appearances at four.

Players
This is a list of players who have played for the United States in the Hopman Cup.

1 Shaughnessy represented the USA in the 2005 and 2009 competitions and also stood in for an ill Serena Williams in the 2008 tie against India.

Results

References

Hopman Cup teams
Hopman Cup